"You the Boss" is a song by American rapper Rick Ross. It was originally released as the first single from his fifth studio album, God Forgives, I Don't on October 7, 2011, along with "I Love My Bitches" but was later taken off the final track list. It was released to U.S. rhythmic radio on October 18. and Urban radio on November 1, 2011. Even though the song charted well, it was later confirmed that "Touch'N You" was the new first single from the album. It features Young Money rapper Nicki Minaj and was produced by K.E. on the Track. The song was certified Gold September 18, 2014, almost three years after its release.

Background
While on the set of filming the music video for Birdman's "Y.U. Mad", Nicki Minaj revealed to MTV that "You the Boss" was originally written and recorded in 2009 for Lil Wayne, but he passed on it. "It was just lingering, and then she gave it to Rick Ross" Minaj said while in character as her alter ego, the Female Weezy. Ross too had initially passed on the record while recording Teflon Don.

Charts

Weekly charts

Year-end charts

Release Information

Purchasable Release

References

2011 singles
Rick Ross songs
Nicki Minaj songs
Songs written by Nicki Minaj
Songs written by Rick Ross
Maybach Music Group singles
Songs written by K.E. on the Track
Song recordings produced by K.E. on the Track
2011 songs